Gene Mitchell Harlow (March 8, 1919 – December 31, 1998) was an American football player and coach.  He served as the head football coach at Arkansas State College, now Arkansas State University, from 1955 to 1957, compiling a record of 15–12.

He is buried in Florence, Alabama.

Head coaching record

References

External links
 

1919 births
1998 deaths
American football fullbacks
American football guards
Alabama Crimson Tide football coaches
Arkansas State Red Wolves football coaches
Idaho Vandals football coaches
Oregon Ducks football coaches
Tulane Green Wave football coaches
Vanderbilt Commodores football players
High school football coaches in Alabama